Incheh Keykanlu (also Romanized as Īncheh Keykānlū) is a village in Dowlatkhaneh Rural District, Bajgiran District, Quchan County, Razavi Khorasan Province, Iran. At the 2006 census, its population was 521, in 141 families.

References 

Populated places in Quchan County